Fast and Loose may refer to:

Fast and Loose (con game), a cheating game sometimes known as "The Strap"
Fast and Loose (1930 film), a romantic comedy starring Miriam Hopkins and Carole Lombard
Fast and Loose (1939 film), a detective comedy starring Robert Montgomery and Rosalind Russell
Fast and Loose (1954 film), a film from the UK starring Stanley Holloway and Kay Kendall
Fast and Loose (TV series), a 2011 UK TV series